Wong Chuk Hang is one of the 17 constituencies in the Southern District, Hong Kong.

The constituency returns one district councillor to the Southern District Council, with an election every four years. The seat was last held by Tsui Yuen-wa of the Democratic Party.

Wong Chuk Hang constituency is loosely based on Wong Chuk Hang and Aberdeen area including Broadview Court with estimated population of 16,589.

Councillors represented

1988 to 1991

1991 to present

Election results

2010s

2000s

1990s

1980s

Notes

Citations

References
2011 District Council Election Results (Southern)
2007 District Council Election Results (Southern)
2003 District Council Election Results (Southern)
1999 District Council Election Results (Southern)
 

Constituencies of Hong Kong
Constituencies of Southern District Council
1988 establishments in Hong Kong
Constituencies established in 1988
Aberdeen, Hong Kong
Wong Chuk Hang